Katherine Lineth Castillo Macías (born 23 March 1996) is a Panamanian footballer who plays as a right back for Tauro FC and the Panama women's national team. She is nicknamed Kathyson.

International career
Castillo appeared in four matches for Panama at the 2018 CONCACAF Women's Championship.

See also
 List of Panama women's international footballers

References

1996 births
Living people
Sportspeople from Panama City
Panamanian women's footballers
Women's association football fullbacks
UAI Urquiza (women) players
Tauro F.C. players
Panama women's international footballers
Pan American Games competitors for Panama
Footballers at the 2019 Pan American Games
Panamanian expatriate women's footballers
Panamanian expatriate sportspeople in Argentina
Expatriate women's footballers in Argentina